The Copa Polla Gol 1984 was the 14th edition of the Chilean Cup tournament. The competition started on May 13, 1984 and concluded on July 25, 1984. Only first level teams took part in the tournament. Everton won the competition for their first time, beating Universidad Católica 3-0 in the final.

Calendar

Group Round

North Group

Central Group

Interzone

Metropolitan Group

South Group

Semifinals

Final

Top goalscorer 
 Aníbal González (O'Higgins) 11 goals

See also 
 1984 Campeonato Nacional

References

Sources 
solofutbol

Chile
1984
1984 in Chilean football